Débéla is a village and the administrative centre (chef-lieu) of the commune of Zanina in the Cercle of Koutiala in the Sikasso Region of southern Mali.

References

Populated places in Sikasso Region